Chase Cabre (born February 7, 1997) is an American stock car racing driver. He last competed full-time in the NASCAR K&N Pro Series East, driving the No. 4 Toyota Camry for Rev Racing. Cabre started his racing career in motocross and later moved to micro-sprints while balancing a soccer career in his formative years. At the end of his four-year tenure with Rev in the developmental stock car ranks, Cabre elected not to chase further stock car opportunities via a pay route and instead chose to return to dirt racing.

Motorsports career results

NASCAR
(key) (Bold – Pole position awarded by qualifying time. Italics – Pole position earned by points standings or practice time. * – Most laps led.)

ARCA Menards Series 
(key) (Bold – Pole position awarded by qualifying time. Italics – Pole position earned by points standings or practice time. * – Most laps led.)

ARCA Menards Series East

References

External links
 

1997 births
Living people
Racing drivers from Tampa, Florida
NASCAR drivers
ARCA Menards Series drivers